Wang Hongzhang (born July 1954) is a Chinese economist and banker who served as party boss and chairman of China Construction Bank, one of the "big four" banks in China.

Wang was an alternate member of the 18th Central Committee of the Communist Party of China. He was a delegate to the 10th National People's Congress and a member of the 17th Central Commission for Discipline Inspection.

Life and career
Wang was born in Changtu County in northeast China's Liaoning province, in July 1954.

He entered the work force in December 1971, during the Cultural Revolution, as a sent-down youth in Jinxi County (now Huludao). He joined the Communist Party of China in June 1974.

He entered Liaoning Finance and Trade College in October 1975, majoring in finance, and graduated in September 1978. He later studied at Central Party School of the Communist Party of China and Dongbei University of Finance and Economics as a part-time student.

After graduation he was assigned to People's Bank of China, where he worked until March 1984, when he was transferred to Industrial & Commercial Bank of China (ICBC).

In November 2003 he was promoted to become head of the Commission for Inspecting Discipline of People's Bank of China, and named a member of CPC Committee, he held that office until November 2011.

In November 2011, he was appointed party secretary and chairman of China Construction Bank, replacing Guo Shuqing.

References

1954 births
People's Republic of China economists
Living people
Liaoning Finance and Trade College alumni
Dongbei University of Finance and Economics alumni
Central Party School of the Chinese Communist Party alumni
Politicians from Tieling
Chinese bankers
Alternate members of the 18th Central Committee of the Chinese Communist Party
Industrial and Commercial Bank of China people
China Construction Bank people
Economists from Liaoning
Businesspeople from Liaoning
People's Republic of China politicians from Liaoning
Chinese Communist Party politicians from Liaoning